Uganda participated at the 2018 Summer Youth Olympics in Buenos Aires, Argentina from 6 October to 18 October 2018.

Competitors

Medalists

Athletics

3 athletes

Rowing

Uganda was given a quota to compete in rowing by the tripartite committee.

 Girls' single sculls - 1 athlete

Weightlifting

Uganda was given a quota by the tripartite committee to compete in weightlifting.

References

2018 in Ugandan sport
Nations at the 2018 Summer Youth Olympics
Uganda at the Youth Olympics